The 2023–24 season will be the 55th season of competitive association football in Australia.

National teams

Men's senior

Friendlies
The following is a list of friendlies (to be) played by the men's senior national team in 2023–24.

Men's under-23

Men's under-20

Men's under-17

Women's senior

Friendlies
The following is a list of friendlies (to be) played by the women's senior national team in 2023–24.

FIFA Women's World Cup

Women's under-20

Women's under-17

Domestic leagues

A-League Men

National Premier Leagues

A-League Women

Domestic cups

Australia Cup

External links
 Football Australia official website

2023 in Australian soccer
2024 in Australian soccer
Seasons in Australian soccer